Close Watch: An Introduction to John Cale is the third compilation album by Welsh musician John Cale. It was released by Island Records in 1999. It featured songs from Cale's albums released between 1973 and 1996.

Track listing 
All songs composed by John Cale, except where indicated.

References

John Cale compilation albums
1999 compilation albums
Albums produced by John Cale
Island Records compilation albums